Kopurererua is a rural community in the upper valley of the Kopurererua Stream in the Western Bay of Plenty District and Bay of Plenty Region of New Zealand's North Island. The lower Kopurererua valley is in Tauranga.

Demographics
Parts of the statistical area will be moved to the existing Tauriko and new Pyes Pa South West statistical areas for the 2023 census as Tauranga's boundaries expand.

Kopurererua had a population of 1,167 at the 2018 New Zealand census, an increase of 132 people (12.8%) since the 2013 census, and an increase of 180 people (18.2%) since the 2006 census. There were 408 households, comprising 597 males and 570 females, giving a sex ratio of 1.05 males per female. The median age was 47.2 years (compared with 37.4 years nationally), with 207 people (17.7%) aged under 15 years, 171 (14.7%) aged 15 to 29, 594 (50.9%) aged 30 to 64, and 192 (16.5%) aged 65 or older.

Ethnicities were 93.1% European/Pākehā, 12.9% Māori, 0.8% Pacific peoples, 1.5% Asian, and 1.8% other ethnicities. People may identify with more than one ethnicity.

The percentage of people born overseas was 13.6, compared with 27.1% nationally.

Although some people chose not to answer the census's question about religious affiliation, 50.4% had no religion, 39.1% were Christian, 1.0% had Māori religious beliefs, 0.3% were Hindu, 0.3% were Buddhist and 1.0% had other religions.

Of those at least 15 years old, 159 (16.6%) people had a bachelor's or higher degree, and 168 (17.5%) people had no formal qualifications. The median income was $40,400, compared with $31,800 nationally. 234 people (24.4%) earned over $70,000 compared to 17.2% nationally. The employment status of those at least 15 was that 486 (50.6%) people were employed full-time, 204 (21.2%) were part-time, and 21 (2.2%) were unemployed.

References

Western Bay of Plenty District
Populated places in the Bay of Plenty Region